Hakea ivoryi , commonly known as Ivory's hakea, corkwood or the corkbark tree, is a shrub or small tree in the family Proteaceae and is endemic to an area in the South West region of Queensland and the north west of New South Wales.

Description
Young trees often  have highly divided segmented leaves. The bark is brown, rough and corky.
The inflorescence consists of 20–50 white-cream flowers on a short stem and appear in leaf axils from October to January.

Taxonomy and naming
Hakea ivoryi was first formally described by Frederick Manson Bailey in 1901 as part of the work The Queensland Flora and the description was published in The Queensland Flora. Hakea ivoryi was named after  William Ivory who collected specimens for Frederick  Bailey.

Distribution and habitat
Scattered or growing in small groups on sand plains or loam in open arid woodland  in the   Bourke-Wanaaring districts and south-western Queensland.

References

ivoryi
Flora of Queensland
Flora of New South Wales
Plants described in 1901